Litmus test may refer to:

 Litmus test (chemistry), used to determine the acidity of a chemical solution
 Litmus test (politics), a question that seeks to find the character of a potential candidate by measuring a single indicator
 Litmus Test of Medjugorje
 The Litmus Test, a Radio 4 programme presented by Fred Harris
 The Litmus Test, a 2004 album by Cut Chemist

See also
 Acid test (disambiguation), a test used to determine whether a metal is real gold or not